The 2011 Consadole Sapporo season was Consadole Sapporo's fourteenth season in the J. League system and 27th overall in the second tier. Consadole Sapporo won promotion to the 2012 J.League Division 1 and was knocked out of the Emperor's Cup in the second round.

Players

Competitions

J. League

Results summary

Results by round

League table

Emperor's Cup

References
J. League - 2011 J. League Schedule

Consadole Sapporo
Hokkaido Consadole Sapporo seasons